Athletics has been contested at every Summer Paralympics since the first games in 1960. Men and women from all disability groups compete in the sport.

Some athletes use wheelchairs or prosthetic limbs and compete in their respective sport independently and under their own power.

Visually impaired athletes participate in running events with the help of a sighted guide, to whom they may be attached by a tether. Sound-emitting devices or a sighted "caller" are used to indicate target areas for throwing events, take-off points for jumping events, and other important locations for visually impaired competitors.

There are several different classifications and groups in which athletes compete that are based on their disability. Each disability has a different classification which determines the class the athletes will compete in. Nearly every opportunity that is available to non-disabled athletes are available in the Paralympics.

In the first edition of the Summer Paralympic Games in 1960, Italy finished the sport in the first place of the medal table, between 1964 to 1996 there was a clear dominance of the United States, being broken in 2000, when Australia dominated the sport at home and since 2004, China has dominated the sport.

Summary

Classification
Athletes compete in various classes which group them according to their impairments and abilities.

Medal summary

Medal table
The following medal table is the winnings of the 2020 Paralympic Games. Countries in italics are former countries who participated in the Paralympic Games. The United States has more than doubled the winnings of any other country, Great Britain and Canada being their closest competitor.

Multi-medallists
Athletes who achieved more than three medals in the Paralympic Games. Updated to 2016 Summer Paralympics.

T/F11 - 13

T/F32 - 38

T/F42 - 46

T/F52 - 58

Events
Note that not all events at a particular games are competed across all classifications

Men's events

Women's events

Nations

See also

Athletics at the Summer Olympics
Marathon at the Paralympics
World Para Athletics Championships

References 

 
Paralympics
Athletics
Paralympics